WKYA (105.5 FM) is a radio station licensed to Greenville, Kentucky, United States.  The station is currently owned by Radio Active Media, Inc. and broadcasts an oldies format.

The station’s studio (shared with sister station WNES and its translator W284AO) and transmitter is located on Everly Brothers Boulevard (U.S. Highway 62) near the Western Kentucky Parkway underpass southwest of Central City.

According to the 2015 FCC ownership report, the licensee is Andy Anderson, who also owns the Greenville Leader-News, the local newspaper. Andy Anderson is the son of the station's founder of the same name.

History
The station went on the air as WGKY-FM on December 22, 1981.

On July 9, 1990, the station changed its call sign to WWHK to reflect the new branding, “105.5 The Hawk”. Then in 1994, the station began simulcasting the adult contemoprary format with now-defunct sister station WAIA in nearby Hartford, in neighboring Ohio County. On October 1, 1996, the station’s callsign was changed to the current WKYA upon changing their format to country music.

On February 1, 2004, WKYA discontinued their country format in favor of oldies.

References

External links
WKYA Oldies Facebook

KYA
Radio stations established in 1981
Oldies radio stations in the United States
Greenville, Kentucky
1981 establishments in Kentucky